Hedley John Price ARIBA (1861 - 8 April 1905) was an English architect based in Nottingham.

Career
He was born in Liverpool in 1861, the son of John Price (b. 1829) and Mary (b. 1834). He was baptised on 22 September 1861 in St Anne’s Church, Stanley, Lancashire.  

He was educated at Nottingham School of Art where he was awarded a Bronze medal for his design for a cathedral and University College Nottingham. 

He studied as a pupil of Abraham Harrison Goodall for 5 years and then remained in this practice as his assistant for another 3 years.
 
He was appointed Associate of the Royal Institute of British Architects on 9 June 1884.

He married Annie Mary Charlesworth in 1898, and his son Hubert H.C. Price was born in 1900. 

He died on 8 April 1905 at his home in The Park, Nottingham.and was buried in Church Cemetery, Nottingham on 11 April 1905.

Notable works

References

1861 births
1905 deaths
Architects from Liverpool
Architects from Nottingham
Associates of the Royal Institute of British Architects
Alumni of Nottingham School of Art